Samuel Lobé (born 7 March 1967) is a French former professional footballer who played as a forward.

References

1967 births
Living people
Footballers from Caen
Association football forwards
French footballers
Black French sportspeople
AS Nancy Lorraine players
Gazélec Ajaccio players
Dijon FCO players
Bourges 18 players
US Créteil-Lusitanos players
FC Rouen players
Stade Lavallois players
Lille OSC players
ES Troyes AC players
FC Martigues players
Red Star F.C. players
Ligue 1 players
Ligue 2 players